Ecurie Francorchamps was a Belgian motor racing team. They are principally known for running privateer cars in Formula One and sports car racing during the 1950s and 1970s. The team was founded by racing driver Jacques Swaters. Between 1952 and 1954 Ecurie Francorchamps raced in Formula One, and raced in sports cars into the 1970s.

Formula One

Ecurie Francorchamps raced in Formula One between 1952 and 1954, and campaigned Ferrari cars. They won one race. Ecurie Francorchamps made their début at the 1952 Belgian Grand Prix with Charles de Tornaco as their driver. De Tornaco finished seventh at that event, retired from the 1952 Dutch Grand Prix, and failed to qualify for the 1952 Italian Grand Prix. Roger Laurent drove the team's Ferrari in the 1952 German Grand Prix, where he finished sixth. In 1953 Swaters and de Tornaco both entered the 1953 Belgian Grand Prix but neither started the race. Swaters finished seventh in the 1953 German Grand Prix, and retired from the 1953 Swiss Grand Prix because he spun off during the first lap. In 1954 Swaters retired in Belgium because his engine failed. He finished eighth in Switzerland and failed to finish in Spain, when his engine failed again. The team's single victory came when owner Jacques Swaters won the non-Championship Avusrennen in 1953.

Sports car racing
Ecurie Francorchamps raced in sports car racing from the 1950s until the 1970s. Ecurie Francorchamps first started in Le Mans in 1953 with a Jaguar C-Type finishing ninth; Charles de Tornaco and Roger Laurent were the drivers. In 1954 they finished fourth with Laurent and team owner Jacques Swaters as the drivers. Ecurie Francorchamps had their best Le Mans finish in 1955 coming home in third place in a Jaguar D-Type. In 1956 Ecurie Francorchamps prepared the Ferrari 250 GT Europa of Olivier Gendebien and Pierre Stasse who finished in third place of the Liège–Rome–Liège Rally. In 1957 they returned at Le Mans with Lucien Bianchi and Georges Harris finishing seventh in a Ferrari 500 TRC and winning the S2000 class. Ecurie Francorchamps would keep returning in Ferraris every single time. Jean Blaton and Alain de Changy finished sixth in 1958. In 1960 Leon Dernier and Pierre Noblet finished sixth overall and third in their GT category. Lucien Bianchi and Georges Berger didn't finish in 1961. Pierre Dumay and Leon Dernier finished in a fine fourth place in 1963 also finishing second in their class. In the 1965 24 Hours of Le Mans Ecurie Francorchamps finished in third place with Willy Mairesse and Jean Blaton at the wheel of a Ferrari 275 GTB, equalling their best result of 1955 and also winning their GT class. Pierre Noblet and Claude Dubois finished tenth in 1966. Ecurie Francorchamps would not return to Le Mans until 1970 where Hughes de Fierlandt and Alistair Walker finished in fifth place in a Ferrari 512S. Hughes de Fierlandt and Alain de Cadenet retired in 1971. 

In 1972 Derek Bell, Teddy Pilette and Richard Bond brought the Ferrari home in eighth position. The following year Richard Bond and Jean-Claude Andruet only could finish 20th. In 1974 Hughes de Fierlandt and Richard Bond retired from the race driving a Porsche 911 Carrera RSR. Jean-Claude Andruet, Teddy Pilette and Hughes de Fierlandt finished 12th in 1975. In the 1978 24 Hours of Le Mans, Ecurie Francorchamps' last Le Mans, Teddy Pilette, Jean Blaton and Raymond Touroul failed to finish at the wheel of a Ferrari 512BB.

Complete Formula One World Championship results
(key) (results in bold indicate pole position; results in italics indicate fastest lap)

References

External links
 http://www.autosport.nl/news/4203/racing_shows_ecurie_francorchamps_hoogtepunt_tijdens_25e_brussels_retro_festival.html
 http://www.autosportvision.nl/?page=news&cat=17&item=3032

Formula One entrants
Belgian auto racing teams
Sport in Stavelot
Auto racing teams established in 1952
Auto racing teams disestablished in 1978
24 Hours of Le Mans teams